Constitutional Assembly elections were held in the People's Socialist Republic of Albania on 31 March 1991, with later rounds on 7 April and 14 April. They were the first multi-party elections since 1923, and were held after the formation of new political parties was legalised on 11 December 1990 following a strike by 700 students at the University of Tirana over poor dormitory conditions and a power failure, which subsequently became politicised under the influence of Sali Berisha.

The result was a landslide victory for the socialist ruling Party of Labour of Albania, which won 169 of the 250 seats. Voter turnout was reported to be 98.6%.

Background
The elections were held in an atmosphere of economic disruption and social instability. The ruling Party of Labour of Albania had various advantages while campaigning, such as control or influence over most media and a far larger pool of resources than its nascent opposition. There was also little opportunity for the urban-based Democratic Party of Albania and other anti-communist opposition parties to influence the rural countryside and its peasantry, who feared that the Democratic Party would privatize land holdings and restore them to pre-war landowners, which the ruling party emphasized as it focused its efforts on rural voters. The PLA and its associated mass organizations (such as the Democratic Front) produced a platform which rested upon stated commitments to preventing the country's slide into "chaos" along with promises of promoting the growth of a regulated market economy, support for political pluralism, and support for European integration. The Democratic Party platform promised the transformation of living standards through membership in the European Community, strong ties with the United States and other Western nations, Gastarbeiter jobs in Italian and German factories abroad, and immediate steps towards a free-market economy.

The United States noticeably supported the Democratic Party, which the ruling PLA criticized to its own advantage. Democratic Party politician and Berisha aide Gramoz Pashko was quoted in mid-March after having visited the United States that his party would receive a "blank check" from the American Government upon coming to power, which would have entailed admission to such organizations as the International Monetary Fund and the World Bank. "David Swartz, the head of the State Department delegation sent to reopen the U.S. embassy in Tiranë, said that the United States would provide Albania with desperately needed humanitarian assistance but that economic aid would be granted only if democratic forces came to power." The National Endowment for Democracy gave around $103,000 to the dissident labor movement backing the Democratic Party along with, according to William Blum, activities aimed to "support training and civic education programs."

Since the start of the campaign Democratic Party leaders claimed to international observers that the elections would neither be free nor fair, and later stated that the elections had been conducted amid a "climate of fear." International observers, however, generally regarded the election as fair and that fraud and manipulation were minimal despite the substantial advantages enjoyed by the PLA. Over 1,000 candidates from 11 parties or political movements, as well as a score of independents, contested the 250 parliamentary seats.

Electoral system 
The 250 members of the Assembly were elected in single-member districts via a two-round system. Candidates who won a majority of the votes (50 percent plus one vote) were elected in the first round. If two candidates obtained over 25 percent of the vote, but less than 50 percent, the top two candidates proceeded to a run-off on 7 April. If only one candidate or no candidates received 25 percent of the vote, the parties would nominate additional candidates to stand for election on 14 April. A candidate who received more than 25 percent of the vote would remain on the ballot with a new challenger. At least two candidates had to appear on the ballot for any given election, or the election would have to be re-run on 14 April.

All Albanian citizens aged 18 or older were eligible to vote, "so long as they had not been convicted of a penal act or were not declared mentally incompetent by a court". Voting was not compulsory, unlike prior elections. Albanian citizens travelling abroad on business were also allowed to vote by obtaining a certificate allowing them to vote out of their district, and, on election day, the voter would present the certificate at the nearest Albanian diplomatic mission. Overseas votes were counted as part of a district in Tirana. Voters with "legitimate reasons" why they would be unable to vote in their assigned district were also given certificates to vote in another, as long as the number of certificates issued was no more than 15% of the total number of registered voters in that district.

Results

Seats won by administrative area

Aftermath
The new People's Assembly was convened on 10 April. On 29 April a new constitution came into effect proclaiming the modern-day Republic of Albania, with the new post of President coming into existence a day later and held by Ramiz Alia, who resigned from his post as First Secretary of the PLA on the same day. On 12 June 1991 the PLA was reformed into the Socialist Party of Albania.

References

External links
ALBANIA Parliamentary Chamber: Kuvendi Popullor: Elections held in 1991 Inter-Parliamentary Union

Albania
1991 in Albania
Parliamentary elections in Albania
March 1991 events in Europe
Election and referendum articles with incomplete results